Allegorical interpretation of the Bible is an interpretive method (exegesis) that assumes that the Bible has various levels of meaning and tends to focus on the spiritual sense, which includes the allegorical sense, the moral (or tropological) sense, and the anagogical sense, as opposed to the literal sense. It is sometimes referred to as the quadriga, a reference to the Roman chariot that was drawn by four horses.

Allegorical interpretation of the Bible has its origins in the Bible itself, with the biblical authors and prophets allegorically interpreting older Scriptures, as is the case with Hosea’s allegorical interpretation of Jacob’s wrestling with the angel at Hosea 12:4. In the Middle Ages, it was used by Bible commentators of Christianity.

Four types

Scriptural interpretation is sometimes referred to as the Quadriga, a reference to the Roman chariot that was pulled by four horses abreast. The four horses are symbolic of the four submethods of Scriptural interpretation.

A Latin rhyme designed to help scholars remember the four interpretations survives from the Middle Ages:

The rhyme is roughly translated:
The literal teaches what God and our ancestors did,
The allegory is where our faith and belief is hid,
The moral meaning gives us the rule of daily life,
The anagogy shows us where we end our strife.

The first three of these modes (literal, allegorical, and moral) were part of Christian tradition as expressed by Origen. St John Cassian (c. 360-435) added the fourth mode (anagogic) in 4th century.  His contemporary, St Augustine of Hippo (354-430) used the four fold interpretive method in his explanation of Christian doctrine, On Christian Doctrine. Due to the widespread popularity of "On Christian Doctrine" in the Middle Ages, the four fold method became the standard in Christian biblical exegesis of that period.

 Literal interpretation: explanation of the meaning of events for historical purposes from a neutral perspective by trying to understand the text in the culture and time it was written, and location and language it was composed in. That is, since the 19th century, usually ascertained using the higher critical methods like source criticism and form criticism. In many modern seminaries and universities, the literal meaning is usually focused on to a nearly complete abandonment of the spiritual methods, as is very obvious when comparing commentary from a Douay Rheims or Confraternity or Knox Bible with a New Jerusalem, NRSV or NABRE.
 Typological (or allegorical) interpretation: connecting the events of the Old Testament with the New Testament, particularly drawing allegorical connections between the events of Christ’s life with the stories of the Old Testament. Also, a passage speaks directly to someone such as when Francis of Assisi heard the passage to sell all he had. It can also typologically point to the Blessed Virgin Mary, who is the ark which held the Word of God; Judith, who slew a tyrant is a Marian type; the burning bush, which contains the fire of God but was not consumed, as Mary held the Second Person of the Trinity in her womb but was not burnt up.
 Tropological (or moral) interpretation: "the moral of the story", or how one should act now. Many of Jesus' parables and the Book of Proverbs and other wisdom books are packed with tropological meaning
 Anagogic interpretation: dealing with the future events of Christian history (eschatology) as well as heaven, purgatory, hell, the last judgement, the General Resurrection and second Advent of Christ, etc. (prophecies).

Antiquity 
Origen, in his Treatise on First Principles, recommends for the Old and New Testaments to be interpreted allegorically at three levels, the "flesh", the "soul", and the "spirit". He states that many of the events recounted in the Scriptures, if they are interpreted in the literal, or fleshly, sense, are impossible or nonsensical. They must be interpreted allegorically to be understood. Some passages have parts that are literally true and parts that are literally impossible. Then, "the reader must endeavor to grasp the entire meaning, connecting by an intellectual process the account of what is literally impossible with the parts that are not impossible but historically true, these being interpreted allegorically in common with the part which, so far as the letter goes, did not happen at all."

Middle Ages
People of the Middle Ages shaped their ideas and institutions from drawing on the cultural legacies of the ancient world. They did not see the break between themselves and their predecessors that today's observers see; they saw continuity with themselves and the ancient world by using allegory to bring together the gaps. The use of allegorical interpretation in the Middle Ages began as a Christian method for studying the differences between the two Testaments (tropological interpretation). Christian scholars believed both Testaments were equally inspired divinely by God and sought to understand the differences between Old Testament and New Testament laws.

Medieval scholars believed the Old Testament to serve as an allegory of New Testament events, such as the story of Jonah and the whale, which represents Jesus' death and resurrection. According to the Old Testament Book of Jonah, a prophet spent three days in the belly of a fish. Medieval scholars believed this was an allegory (using the typological interpretation) of Jesus' death and his being in the tomb for three days before he rose from the dead.

See also
 Aesthetic interpretation
 Allegorical interpretations of Plato
 Demythologization
 Esoteric interpretation of the Quran
 Four senses of Scripture
 Hermeneutics
 Parallelomania
 Pardes (Jewish exegesis)
 Typology (theology)

References

Further reading

External links

Biblical exegesis
Allegory
Bible